David Soul (born David Richard Solberg; August 28, 1943) is an American-British actor and singer. He is known for his role as Detective Kenneth "Hutch" Hutchinson in the television series Starsky & Hutch from 1975 to 1979; Joshua Bolt on Here Come the Brides from 1968 to 1970; and Officer John Davis in Magnum Force in 1973. As a singer, he scored one US hit and five UK hits with songs such as "Don't Give Up on Us" (US & UK No. 1) in 1976 and "Silver Lady" (UK No. 1) in 1977.

Early life
Soul was born on August 28, 1943, in Chicago, Illinois, United States, and is of Norwegian descent. His mother, June Johnanne (Nelson), was a teacher, and his father, Dr. Richard W. Solberg, was a Lutheran minister, professor of History and Political Science, and director of Higher Education for the Lutheran Church in America (now part of the ELCA). Both of Soul's grandfathers were evangelists. Dr. Solberg was also senior representative for Lutheran World Relief during the reconstruction of Germany after World War II from 1949 until 1956. Because of this, the family moved frequently during Soul's youth.

The family was living in Sioux Falls, South Dakota, where Soul's father taught political science and history at Augustana College, when Soul graduated from that city's Washington High School. Soul attended Augustana College for two years before the family moved again, this time to Mexico City, where he studied for one year at the University of the Americas. While in Mexico, inspired by students who taught him to play the guitar, Soul changed his direction and decided to follow his passion for music. His first appearance upon returning from Mexico was in a club in Minneapolis, The 10 O'Clock Scholar.

Career
Soul began performing on stage as an actor in the mid-1960s, when he became a founding member of the Firehouse Theater in Minneapolis. He traveled with the company to New York City in 1965, appearing in Bertolt Brecht's Baal and John Arden's Sergeant Musgrave's Dance. Soul first gained national attention as the "Covered Man" appearing on The Merv Griffin Show in 1966 and 1967, on which he sang while wearing a mask. He explained: "My name is David Soul, and I want to be known for my music." The same year, he made his television debut in Flipper. In 1967, he signed a contract with Columbia Pictures and following a number of guest appearances, including the episode "The Apple" from the second season of Star Trek, he landed the role of Joshua Bolt on the television program Here Come the Brides with co-stars Robert Brown, Bobby Sherman and Bridget Hanley. The series was telecast on the ABC network from September 25, 1968, to September 18, 1970. In 1972, he co-starred as Arthur Hill's law partner on Owen Marshall: Counselor at Law. Following numerous guest-starring roles on TV, including Streets of San Francisco, he was cast by Clint Eastwood in the film Magnum Force.

His breakthrough came when he portrayed Detective Ken "Hutch" Hutchinson on Starsky & Hutch, a role he played from 1975 until 1979. Soul also directed three episodes of Starsky and Hutch: "Huggy Can't Go Home"  (1979), "Manchild on the Streets" (1977), and "Survival" (1977). Throughout his career, he made guest appearances on  Star Trek, I Dream of Jeannie, McMillan & Wife, Cannon, Gunsmoke, All in the Family, and numerous TV movies and mini-series, including Homeward Bound (1980), World War III and Rage (1980) a TV movie commended on the floor of the U.S. Senate and for which he received an Emmy Award nomination. Soul also starred with James Mason in the 1979 TV miniseries adaptation of Stephen King's Salem's Lot, which was edited and released as a theatrical feature film in some countries.

During the mid-1970s, Soul returned to his singing roots. He scored one US hit with "Don't Give Up on Us" (1977) which reached No. 1 in the US and the UK. "Silver Lady" (1977) hit No. 1 in the UK. From 1976 until 1978, he had five UK top 20 singles and two top 10 UK albums. From 1976 to 1982, he toured extensively in the U.S., Europe, Far East, and South America.

In the U.S., he continued to make guest appearances in various television series. He starred in the miniseries The Manions of America as Caleb Staunton in 1981. He starred in the short-lived 1983 NBC series Casablanca, playing nightclub owner Rick Blaine (the immortalized role that was made famous by Humphrey Bogart in the 1942 film Casablanca), and co-starred in the NBC series The Yellow Rose during the 1983–1984 season. He also starred in the television adaptation of Ken Follett's wartime drama The Key to Rebecca (1985) directed by David Hemmings. He later starred as the infamous Florida robber Michael Platt in the TV movie In the Line of Duty: The F.B.I. Murders (1988), which depicted the 1986 FBI Miami shootout and which was subsequently used as an FBI training film. Soul also directed the episode "No Exit" of the 1980s TV series Miami Vice. In 1987, Soul was cast as Major Oldham in the movie The Hanoi Hilton.

In the mid-1990s, Soul moved to England, forging a new career on the West End stage, including the role of Chandler Tate in Comic Potential and The Narrator in Blood Brothers. He also participated in the successful 1997 election campaign of his personal friend Martin Bell who ran as an MP for Tatton, as well as Bell's unsuccessful campaign in Brentwood in Essex in the 2001 General Election.

In 2001 and 2002, he appeared in Holby City as Alan Fletcher.
 
In 2003, he appeared (as himself) in the first series of the BBC's Little Britain. In 2004, he appeared in Agatha Christie's Poirot – Death on the Nile in the role of Andrew Pennington (he had also starred in the 1989 film adaptation of Christie's Appointment with Death). Soul was a guest on the BBC's Top Gear. He was one of the fastest drivers to have appeared on the show, finishing the lap in 1:54:00, but managed to break the car's gearbox (and subsequently a backup car's) very close to the finish.

On July 12, 2004, he took over playing the role of Jerry Springer in Jerry Springer - The Opera at the Cambridge Theatre in London, televised by the BBC in 2005. He returned to the West End in 2006, playing Mack in a new production of Jerry Herman's musical Mack and Mabel at the Criterion Theatre. The production co-starred Janie Dee and was directed by John Doyle. He also appeared in the TV series Dalziel & Pascoe (Game of Soldiers). He had a brief cameo in the 2004 movie version of Starsky & Hutch, alongside original co-star Paul Michael Glaser.

In August 2008, Soul appeared in the reality TV talent show-themed television series Maestro on BBC Two mentored by Natalia Luis-Bassa.

He appeared with Fred Ward and Willem Dafoe in the film Farewell directed by Christian Carion, which received its U.S. release in 2010.

In June 2012, Soul made a one-week appearance with Jerry Hall at the Gaiety Theatre, Dublin in a reprise of the Pulitzer Prize-nominated play by A.R. Gurney, Love Letters. On July 29, 2012, Soul appeared in an episode of the British television detective drama series Lewis, playing a murder victim. He was also featured in the hit album by Fosseytango, singing on the track "Landlord". In 2013, Soul appeared in a cameo role in the Scottish film Filth lip-syncing his own recording of "Silver Lady". In 2014, Soul appeared in a British television commercial for National Express singing "Silver Lady" while driving a coach.

Personal life
Soul has been married five times and has five sons and a daughter. He first married the actress Mirriam "Mim" Solberg (née Russeth), in 1964. The couple had one child, but the marriage lasted only a year.

Soul married actress Karen Carlson in 1968, after they met on the set of the television series Here Come the Brides. The couple also had a child, but divorced in 1977.

During the years he was filming Starsky & Hutch, Soul had an open relationship with actress Lynne Marta.

In 1980, Soul married Patti Carnel Sherman, ex-wife of Bobby Sherman, the 1960s pop idol and Soul's co-star in Here Come the Brides. Soul was jailed and ordered to attend therapy classes for alcoholism, after attacking her when she was seven months pregnant.

In 1987, Soul married actress Julia Nickson. The couple had one child, China Soul, who is a singer/songwriter.

Soul married his fifth wife, Helen Snell, in June 2010. They had been in a relationship since 2002 after meeting when Soul was working in the British stage production of Deathtrap.

In 2004, Soul obtained British citizenship.

Filmography

Film

Television

Discography

Albums

Studio albums

Compilation albums

Singles

Bibliography
 Top Pop Singles 1955–2002 by Joel Whitburn – 2003
 The Life, The Legend by David Tailford – 1987

See also
List of 1970s one-hit wonders in the United States

References

External links

1943 births
Living people
20th-century American male actors
20th-century British male actors
20th-century American male singers
20th-century American singers
21st-century American male actors
21st-century British male actors
21st-century American male singers
21st-century American singers
American emigrants to England
American Lutherans
American male film actors
American male television actors
American people of Norwegian descent
American television directors
Augustana University alumni
British Lutherans
British male film actors
British male singers
British male television actors
British people of Norwegian descent
British pop singers
British television directors
Male actors from Chicago
Naturalised citizens of the United Kingdom
Private Stock Records artists
University of Minnesota alumni